"Do Anything You Want To" is a song by the Irish hard rock band Thin Lizzy.  It was the second single released from their 1979 album Black Rose: A Rock Legend. It was recorded at Pathe Marconi EMI Studios in Paris, France.

Composition
The song opens with an African-style drum beat by Brian Downey--which gives way to a twin-guitar melody characteristic of Thin Lizzy's harmonics. The lyrics employ rhyme and alliteration-- such as in the first three lines which include the words: 'investigate', 'insinuate', 'intimidate', 'complicate', 'wait', 'hesitate', 'state', 'fate' and 'awaits.' The song fades out with lead singer Phil Lynott impersonating Elvis Presley. Guitarist Scott Gorham suggested: "I think he just wanted to use his American accent there."

Chart performance and video
The single reached No. 14 in the British charts and remained in the charts for nine weeks. It reached No. 25 in Ireland-- charting for two weeks. An accompanying video was filmed at Molineir Studios, directed by David Mallet. Mallet said that the video cost £12–15,000 to film adding: "Most of the shoots I did with Lizzy back then only lasted a day-- maybe eight or ten hours worth of footage." The video was the band's first attempt at a short film rather than a simple video of a band performance. The video featured Hot Gossip dancers Perri Lister, Dominique Wood and Carole Fletcher.

Subsequent releases
This track has been featured on several Thin Lizzy compilation albums including: The Adventures of Thin Lizzy released in 1981, Dedication: The Very Best of Thin Lizzy released in 1991, and Wild One: The Very Best of Thin Lizzy released in 1996. It was subsequently included on the Vagabonds, Kings, Warriors, Angels box set in 2002, as well as the Greatest Hits and Definitive Collection set. 

"Just the Two of Us," (the single's B-side) is a Lynott/Gorham composition that was not included on the Black Rose album. It was only available as part of the single until the release of Vagabonds Kings Warriors Angels.

Personnel
Phil Lynott – bass guitar, lead vocals
Scott Gorham – lead guitar
Gary Moore – lead guitar
Brian Downey – drums

References

Thin Lizzy songs
1979 singles
Songs written by Phil Lynott
Song recordings produced by Tony Visconti
Music videos directed by David Mallet (director)